Péter Somfai (born 2 April 1980) is a Hungarian épée fencer, team silver medal in the 2009 and 2011 World Championships and team gold medal in the  2009 and 2010 European Championships.

His best results in the Fencing World Cup are bronze medals in the Koweit City Grand Prix and the Doha Grand Prix in 2009.

References
 Profile at the European Fencing Confederation

External links
 
 
 
 
 

1980 births
Living people
Hungarian male épée fencers
Olympic fencers of Hungary
Olympic bronze medalists for Hungary
Olympic medalists in fencing
Fencers at the 2016 Summer Olympics
Medalists at the 2016 Summer Olympics
20th-century Hungarian people
21st-century Hungarian people